Rick West  is an American politician serving as a member of the Oklahoma House of Representatives from the 3rd district. He was previously elected in 2016 to serve for one term and retired in 2018. In November 2020 he got elected back to his old seat after winning the primaries against his predecessor Lundy Kiger. He was sworn in on January 11, 2021.

Career 
West worked as a poultry farmer, cattle rancher, and animal inspector for the USDA.

References 

Republican Party members of the Oklahoma House of Representatives
21st-century American politicians
Year of birth missing (living people)
Living people